Manuel Corrales (18 December 1896 – October 1936) was a Spanish sports shooter. He competed in the 25 m rapid fire pistol and 50 m rifle events at the 1932 Summer Olympics. He was killed during the Spanish Civil War in 1936 aged 39.

References

External links
 

1896 births
1936 deaths
Spanish male sport shooters
Olympic shooters of Spain
Shooters at the 1932 Summer Olympics
People from Zamora, Spain
Sportspeople from the Province of Zamora
Spanish casualties of the Spanish Civil War
Military personnel killed in the Spanish Civil War
Olympians killed in warfare